David Samuel may refer to:

David Samuel, 3rd Viscount Samuel (1922-2014), Israeli member of the British House of Lords
David Samuel (bishop) (born 1930), Continuing Anglican bishop in England
David Samuel (rugby union) (1869–1943), Welsh international rugby union forward

See also
David Samuels (disambiguation)